is a Japanese fashion model and singer.

Early life
She was born in Kanagawa Prefecture to a Filipino mother and a Japanese father.

Career

Modelling
She started her career in 2008 when she appeared in the fashion magazine Ranzuki until October 2010. She also participated in fashion events such as Shibuya Woman Festival and Shibuya Gal Festival.

Music
As a singer, she debuted in July 2009 when she joined the group Romeo, composed of Ayumi Sato, Tanaka and Hikichi Takazumi. She has also been a member of the all-female group Iloilo since November 2010.

References

External links
 Official agency profile 
 Official blog
 Rika Mamiya on Twitter

Japanese female models
Japanese women pop singers
21st-century Japanese actresses
Japanese radio personalities
Japanese people of Filipino descent
People from Kanagawa Prefecture
1992 births
Living people
Musicians from Kanagawa Prefecture
21st-century Japanese singers
21st-century Japanese women singers